Aphomia baryptera is a moth of the family Pyralidae. It is known from Australia.

References

Moths described in 1901
Tirathabini
Moths of Australia